Wells Bridge is a hamlet (and census-designated place) in Otsego County, New York, United States. Wells Bridge has a post office with ZIP code 13859.

References

Hamlets in Otsego County, New York
Hamlets in New York (state)